Alf Wollebæk (8 January 1879 – 9 March 1960) was a Norwegian zoologist and curator.

Personal life
Wollebæk was born in Lier to colonel Sigurd Polidor Wollebæk (1835–1920) and his wife Anine Julie Augusta Dahl (1834–1912). His elder brother was jurist and diplomatist Johan Wollebæk (1875–1940). He was married twice; first in 1903 to Agnes Hanssen (1879–1930; sister of sports executive Carl Frølich Hanssen), and in 1932 to Ruth Jensen (1891–1958).

Career
After graduating in Fredrikstad in 1898, he received a job at the experimental station in Drøbak with marine biologist Johan Hjort (1869–1948). From 1900 to 1907 he was a zoologist at the Society of Norwegian Fisheries Promotion in Bergen. Wollebæk was assigned with Bergens Museum from 1907, and with the Natural History Museum at the University of Oslo from 1908 to 1949.

His publications centered on marine and Arctic fauna. In 1922 he started publishing a column in the magazine Nyt Magazin for Naturvidenskaberne ("Contributions from the Zoological Museum"). His books include Norges krybdyr og padder (1918), Norges pattedyr (1921), Norges fisker (1924), På tokt til Vestindia (1932), and De forheksede øer (1934). He was decorated Commander of the Latvian Order of the Three Stars in 1937, and with the King's Medal of Merit in gold in 1959.

The species Zalophus wollebaeki – Galápagos sea lion – is named after him.

References

1879 births
1960 deaths
People from Lier, Norway
20th-century Norwegian zoologists
Norwegian curators
Directors of museums in Norway
Academic staff of the University of Oslo
Norwegian columnists
Recipients of the King's Medal of Merit